Mazhar Abbas is a Pakistani journalist.  He was the deputy director of ARY News Television, the bilingual news channel in Pakistan, and the secretary general of the Pakistan Federal Union of Journalists. He is the brother of Zaffar Abbas, the editor of Dawn, and Azhar Abbas (journalist), the managing director of Geo News.

Early life
Abbas studied journalism at the University of Karachi. He wants to give each citizen in Pakistan the right to speak on social and human rights issues, regardless of what the military and government are doing. Because of this, he has covered many controversial cases over the years.

In his early career in 2002, he covered the kidnapping and murder of Daniel Pearl, a Wall Street Journal Bureau Chief.

Career

Abbas worked for Agence France-Presse as Bureau Chief in Karachi for six years.

Abbas is the deputy director of the ARY News Television network. Through this network, he focuses on providing commentary on the country's powerful and controversial military and government figures. He also provides financial support to journalists who are working in difficult conditions as they try to report on the truth of what is happening in dangerous areas.

Abbas was awarded the CPJ International Press Freedom Award in 2007.

He was awarded the Missouri Honour Medal for Distinguished Service in Journalism in 2009.

Abbas, who has worked as a journalist for nearly thirty years, has received threats as a result of his work. After protesting the closing of three independent TV channels for their reporting on demonstrations against President Musharraf, he was charged by police in early 2007. In May 2007, he and two other journalists found white envelopes containing bullets placed on their cars.

Political views

As a member of the Karachi press club, whose members regularly perform demonstrations against the government in the name of human and civil rights, he ended up on a hit list of the Mohajir Rabita Council, an ethnic political group in Pakistan's southern province of Sindh, which is allied with former President Pervez Musharraf.

Personal life and family 
Abbas's father, an educationist, was Mirza Abid Abbas, the former secretary of the Hyderabad Board of Education; he died in 2002. Mazhar has four brothers, Brig. Athar Abbas, Zaffar Abbas, Anwer Abbas, and Azhar Abbas.

In 2008, Abbas's brother, Athar Abbas, became the Director General of the ISPR. He served until 2012 and was Pakistan's Ambassador to Ukraine from 2015 to 2018. His other brother Azhar Abbas (journalist) was the managing director of Geo News (TV network), while another Zaffar Abbas is the editor of Dawn (newspaper) and he has another brother named Anwer Abbas.

Abbas has two daughters.

References

External links
 Interview with Mazhar Abbas on Newsline magazine

1958 births
Living people
Pakistani male journalists
Urdu-language journalists
Geo News newsreaders and journalists
ARY News newsreaders and journalists